= Percy Faith Plays George Gershwin's Porgy and Bess =

Studio album by Percy Faith
- Released: 1959
- Genre: Easy listening
- Label: Columbia

Percy Faith Plays George Gershwin's Porgy and Bess is a 1959 album by Percy Faith. It was released in 1959 by Columbia Records (catalog no. CS8105). The album features Faith and his orchestra playing music from George Gershwin's Porgy and Bess.

It debuted on the pop album chart on May 25, 1959, peaked at the No. 17 spot, and remained on the chart for 14 weeks.

== Track listing ==
Side A

1. "Catfish Row"
2. "Summertime"
3. "A Woman Is a Sometime Thing"
4. "My Man's Gone Now"
5. "Leavin' for the Promised Land"
6. "I Got Plenty O' Nuttin'"
7. "The Buzzard Song"

Side B

1. "Bess, You Is My Woman Now"
2. "Oh I Can't Sit Down"
3. "It Ain't Necssarily So"
4. "The Strawberry Woman and the Crab Man"
5. "I Loves You, Porgy"
6. "There's a Boat That's Leavin' Soon for New York"
7. "Bess, Oh Where's My Boss"
8. "O Lawd I'm on My Way"
